In the field of medicine, radiomics is a method that extracts a large number of features from medical images using data-characterisation algorithms. These features, termed radiomic features, have the potential to uncover tumoral patterns and characteristics that fail to be appreciated by the naked eye. The hypothesis of radiomics is that the distinctive imaging features between disease forms may be useful for predicting prognosis and therapeutic response for various cancer types, thus providing valuable information for personalized therapy. Radiomics emerged from the medical fields of radiology and oncology and is the most advanced in applications within these fields. However, the technique can be applied to any medical study where a pathological process can be imaged.

Process

Image acquisition 
The image data is provided by radiological modalities as CT, MRI, PET/CT or even PET/MR. The produced raw data volumes are used to find different pixel/voxel characteristics through extraction tools.

The extracted features are saved in large databases were clinics have access so as to enable broadly collaborative and cumulative work in which all can benefit from growing amounts of data, ideally enabling a more precise workflow.

Image segmentation 
After the images have been saved in the database, they have to be reduced to the essential parts, in this case the tumors, which are called “volumes of interest”.

Because of the large image data that needs to be processed, it would be too much work to perform the segmentation manually for every single image if a radiomics database with lots of data is created. Instead of manual segmentation, an automated process has to be used. A possible solution are automatic and semiautomatic segmentation algorithms. Before it can be applied on a big scale an algorithm must score as high as possible in the following four tasks:
 First, it must be reproducible, which means that when it is used on the same data the outcome will not change. 
 Another important factor is the consistency. The algorithm does solve the problem at hand and performs the task rather than doing something that is not important. In this case, it is necessary that the algorithm can detect the diseased part in all different scans.
 The algorithm also needs to be accurate. It is very important that the algorithm detects the diseased part in the most precise way possible. Only with accurate data, accurate results can be achieved.
 A minor but still important point is the time efficiency. The results should be generated as fast as possible so that the whole process of radiomics can also be accelerated. A minor point means in this case that, if it is in a certain frame, it is not as important as the others.

Feature extraction and qualification 
After the segmentation, many features can be extracted and the relative net change from longitudinal images (delta-radiomics) can be computed. Radiomic features can be divided into five groups: size and shape based–features, descriptors of the image intensity histogram, descriptors of the relationships between image voxels (e.g. gray-level co-occurrence matrix (GLCM), run length matrix (RLM), size zone matrix (SZM), and neighborhood gray tone difference matrix (NGTDM) derived textures, textures extracted from filtered images, and fractal features. The mathematical definitions of these features are independent of imaging modality and can be found in the literature.
A detailed description of texture features for radiomics can be found in Parekh et al. (2016)  and Depeursinge et al. (2017).

Due to its massive variety, feature reductions need to be implemented to eliminate redundant information. Hundreds of different features need to be evaluated with a selection algorithms to accelerate this process. Additionally, features that are unstable and non-reproducible should be eliminated since features with low-fidelity will likely lead to spurious findings and unrepeatable models.

Analysis 
After the selection of features that are important for our task it is crucial to analyze the chosen data. Before the actual analysis, the clinical and molecular (sometimes even the genetic) data needs to be integrated because it has a big impact on what can be deducted from the analysis. There are different methods to finally analyze the data. First, the different features are compared to one another to find out whether they have any information in common and to reveal what it means when they all occur at the same time.

Another way is Supervised or Unsupervised Analysis. Supervised Analysis uses an outcome variable to be able to create prediction models. Unsupervised Analysis summarizes the information we have and can be represented graphically. So that the conclusion of our results is clearly visible.

Databases

Creation 
Several steps are necessary to create an integrated radiomics database. The imaging data needs to be exported from the clinics. This is already a very challenging step because the patient information is very sensitive and governed by Privacy laws, such as HIPAA. At the same time the exported data must not lose any of its integrity when compressed so that the database only incorporates data of the same quality.  The integration of clinical and molecular data is important as well and a large image storage location is needed.

Use 
The goal of radiomics is to be able to use this database for new patients. This means that we need algorithms that run new input data through the database which return a result with information about what the course of the patients’ disease might look like. For example, how fast the tumor will grow or how good the chances are that the patient survives for a certain time, whether distant metastases are possible and where. This determines how the further treatment (like surgery, chemotherapy, radiotherapy or targeted drugs etc.) and the best solution which maximizes survival or improvement is selected. The algorithm has to recognize correlations between the images and the features, so that it is possible to extrapolate from the data base material to the input data.

Applications

Prediction of clinical outcomes 
Aerts et al. (2014) performed the first large-scale radiomic study that included three lung and two head-and-neck cancer cohorts, consisting of over 1000 patients. They assessed the prognostic values of over 400 textural and shape- and intensity-based features extracted from the computed tomography (CT) images acquired before any treatment. Tumor volumes were defined either by expert radiation oncologists or using semiautomatic segmentation methods. Their results identified a subset of radiomic features that may be useful for predicting patient survival and describing intratumoural heterogeneity. They also confirmed that the prognostic ability of these radiomics features may be transferred from lung to head-and-neck cancer. However, Parmar et al. (2015) demonstrated that prognostic value of some radiomic features may be cancer type dependent. Particularly, they observed that not every radiomic feature that significantly predicted the survival of lung cancer patients could also predict the survival of head-and-neck cancer patients and vice versa.

Nasief et al. (2019) showed that changes of radiomic features over time in longitudinal images (delta-radiomic features, DRFs) can potentially be used as a biomarker to predict treatment response for pancreatic cancer. Their results showed that a Bayesian regularization neural network can be used to identify a subset of DRFs that demonstrated significant changes between good- and bad- responders following 2–4 weeks of treatment with an AUC = 0.94. They also showed (Nasief et al., 2020) that DRFs are independent predictor of survival and if combined with the clinical biomarker CA19-9 can improve treatment response prediction and increase the possibility for response-based treatment adaptation .

Several studies have also showed that radiomic features are better at predicting treatment response than conventional measures, such as tumor volume and diameter, and the maximum radiotracer uptake on positron emission tomography (PET) imaging. Using this technique an algorithm has been developed, after initial training based on intra tumor lymphocyte density, to predict the probability of tumor response to immunotherapy, providing a demonstration of the clinical potential of radiomics as a powerful tool for personalized therapy in the emerging field of immunooncology. Other studies have also demonstrated the utility of radiomics for predicting immunotherapy response of NSCLC patients using pre-treatment CT and PET/CT images.

Radiomics remains inferior to conventional techniques in some applications, suggesting the necessity of continued improvement and manipulation of Radiomics features to different clinical scenarios.  For instance, Ludwig et al. (2020) demonstrated that morphological Radiomics features were inferior to previously established features in the discrimination of intracranial aneurysm rupture status from 3-dimensional rotational angiography.

Prognostication
Radiomic studies have shown that image-based markers have the potential to provide information orthogonal to staging and biomarkers and improve prognostication.

Prediction risk of distant metastasis 
Metastatic potential of tumors may also be predicted by radiomic features. For example, thirty-five CT-based radiomic features were identified to be predictive of distant metastasis of lung cancer in a study by Coroller et al. in 2015. They thus concluded that radiomic features can be useful to identify patients with high risk of developing distant metastasis, guiding physicians to select the effective treatment for individual patients.

Assessment of cancer genetics 
Lung tumor biological mechanisms may demonstrate distinct and complex imaging patterns. In particular, Aerts et al. (2014) showed that radiomic features were associated with biological gene sets, such as cell cycle phase, DNA recombination, regulation of immune system process, etc. Moreover, various mutations of glioblastoma (GBM), such as 1p/19q deletion, MGMT methylation, TP53, EGFR, and NF1, have been shown to be significantly predicted by magnetic resonance imaging (MRI) volumetric measures, including tumor volume, necrosis volume, and contrast enhancing volume.

Image guided radiotherapy 
Radiomics offers the advantage to be non invasive and can therefore be repeated prospectively for a given patient more easily than invasive tumor biopsies. It has been suggested that radiomics could be a mean to monitor tumor dynamic changes along the course of radiotherapy and to define sub volumes at risk for which dose escalation could be beneficial.

Distinguishing true progression from radionecrosis 
Treatment effect or radiation necrosis after stereotactic radiosurgery (SRS) for brain metastases is a common phenomenon often indistinguishable from true progression. Radiomics demonstrated significant differences in a set of 82 treated lesions in 66 patients with pathological outcomes.  Top-ranked Radiomic features feed into an optimized IsoSVM classifier resulted in a  sensitivity and specificity of 65.38% and 86.67%, respectively, with an area under the curve of 0.81 on leave-one-out cross-validation. Only 73% of cases were classifiable by the neuroradiologist, with a sensitivity of 97% and specificity of 19%.  These results show that radiomics holds promise for differentiating between treatment effect and true progression in brain metastases treated with SRS.

Prediction of physiological events
Radiomics can also be used to identify challenging physiological events such as brain activity, which is usually studied with imaging techniques such as functional MRI "fMRI". FMRI raw images can undergo radiomic analysis to generate imaging features that can be later correlated with meaningful brain activity.

Multiparametric radiomics 
Multiparametric radiological imaging is vital for detection, characterization and diagnosis of many different diseases. However, current methods in radiomics are limited to using single images for the extraction of these textural features and may limit the applicable scope of radiomics in different clinical settings. Thus, in the current form, they are not capable of capturing the true underlying tissue characteristics in high dimensional multiparametric imaging space.

Recently, a Multiparametric imaging radiomic framework termed MPRAD for extraction of radiomic features from high dimensional datasets was developed.  The Multiparametric Radiomics was tested on two different organs and diseases; breast cancer and cerebrovascular accidents in brain, commonly referred to as stroke.

Breast cancer 
In breast cancer, The MPRAD framework classified malignant from benign breast lesions with excellent sensitivity and specificity of 87% and 80.5% respectively with an AUC of 0.88.  MPRAD provided a 9%-28% increase in AUC over single radiomic parameters. More importantly, in breast, normal glandular tissue MPRAD were similar between each group with no significance differences.

Stroke 
Similarly, the MPRAD features in brain stroke demonstrated increased performance in distinguishing the perfusion-diffusion mismatch compared to single parameter radiomics and there were no differences within the white and gray matter tissue. The majority of the single radiomic second order features (GLCM) did not show any significant textural difference between infarcted tissue and tissue at risk on the ADC map. Whereas the same second order multiparametric radiomic features (TSPM) were significantly different for the DWI dataset. Similarly, multiparametric radiomic values for the TTP and PWI dataset demonstrated excellent results for the MPRAD. The MPRAD TSPM Entropy exhibited significant difference between infarcted tissue and potential tissue-at-risk: (6.6±0.5 vs 8.4±0.3, p=0.01).

See also 
 Medical image computing
 Computational anatomy
 omics

References 

Medical imaging